Misha Elena Kilmer is an American applied mathematician known for her work in numerical linear algebra and scientific computing. She is William Walker Professor of Mathematics at Tufts University. Starting July 1, 2021, she will serve as Deputy Director of ICERM, where she served on the Scientific Advisory Board.

Kilmer graduated magna cum laude from Wake Forest University in 1992, and earned a master's degree from Wake Forest in 1994.
She completed her Ph.D. in 1997 at the University of Maryland, College Park.
After postdoctoral research at Northeastern University, she joined the Tufts faculty in 1999. She was given the William Walker Professorship in 2016, and chaired the Tufts Mathematics Department from 2013 to 2019.

In 2019 Kilmer was named a SIAM Fellow "for her fundamental contributions to numerical linear algebra and scientific computing, including ill-posed problems, tensor decompositions, and iterative methods".

References

External links
Home page

Year of birth missing (living people)
Living people
Wake Forest University alumni
University of Maryland, College Park alumni
Tufts University faculty
Fellows of the Society for Industrial and Applied Mathematics